Oroshori, or Roshorvi are Iranian peoples of the Pamir group who are native to the Gorno-Badakhshan Autonomous Region of eastern Tajikistan. A 1972 estimate put the population of the Oroshoris at around 2,000.

Language 

The Oroshori language is a dialect of Shughni. Linguistically, Oroshori has close affinities towards the Bartangi and Sarikoli language although it's more closely related to the former. Due to the Oroshoris' proximity to Kirghiz groups, there is evidence of mutual linguistic influence.

References

Ethnic groups in Tajikistan
Pamiri people